Tuff Enuff is a 1986 studio album by Texas-based blues rock band The Fabulous Thunderbirds, which pointed the band in a more mainstream direction. The single "Tuff Enuff" was featured in the films Gung Ho and Tough Guys, as was the follow-up single "Wrap It Up". It has also been played a number of times on the sitcom Married... with Children. "Tuff Enuff" remains the band's only Top 40 hit, peaking at No. 10 on the Billboard Hot 100.

Track listing 
 "Tuff Enuff" (Kim Wilson) - 3:22
 "Tell Me" (Eddie Shuler, Sidney Simien) - 2:43
 "Look at That, Look at That" (Wilson, Fran Christina, Preston Hubbard, Jimmie Vaughan) - 3:25
 "Two Time My Lovin'" (Wilson) - 3:41
 "Amnesia" (Wilson) - 3:45
 "Wrap It Up" (Isaac Hayes, David Porter) - 2:42
 "True Love" (Wilson) - 3:08
 "Why Get Up" (Bill Carter, Ruth Ellen Ellsworth) - 3:48
 "I Don't Care" (Wilson) - 2:49
 "Down at Antones" (instrumental) (Wilson, Christina, Hubbard, Vaughan) - 3:03

Personnel
The Fabulous Thunderbirds
Kim Wilson - vocals, harmonica
Jimmie Vaughan - guitar, steel guitar, bass, vocals
Preston Hubbard - electric and acoustic bass, vocals
Fran Christina - drums, vocals
with:
Al Copley - keyboards
Chuck Leavell - keyboards on "Look at That, Look at That"
Geraint Watkins - piano, accordion on "Amnesia"
Cesar Rosas, David Hidalgo - vocals on "Two Time My Lovin'"

Album Design-Spencer Drate, Judith Salavetz;
Front cover artwork-Dan Youngblood

References

External links

1986 albums
The Fabulous Thunderbirds albums
Albums produced by Dave Edmunds
CBS Records albums